Dachnipora is a town and a notified area committee in Anantnag district of the Indian union territory of Jammu and Kashmir.

References

Ancient Indian cities
Cities and towns in Anantnag district